Mohan Singh Tur (1915–1979) was an Indian politician and former Jathedar of Akal Takht and president of Shiromani Akali Dal . He was also known as Jathedar Mohan Singh Tur. He was elected to the Lok Sabha, the lower house of the Parliament of India from the Tarn Taran  constituency of Punjab in 1977 as a member of the Akali Dal.

Personal life 
He was married to Gurdip Kaur. He had 5 sons and 3 daughters, Lehna Singh Tur was one of his sons and also his successor in 1980.

His son, Tarlochan Singh Tur (1947 – 2016), was also a politician.

References

External links
 Official biographical sketch in Parliament of India website

1916 births
1979 deaths
Shiromani Akali Dal politicians
Lok Sabha members from Punjab, India
India MPs 1977–1979
Politicians from Amritsar district
People from Tarn Taran Sahib